A Witch's Tangled Hare is a 1959 Warner Bros. Looney Tunes theatrical cartoon short directed by Abe Levitow. The short was released on October 31, 1959, and stars Bugs Bunny. Mel Blanc plays voice roles for Bugs Bunny and Sam Crubish, while June Foray voices Witch Hazel. The cartoon makes many references to various plays by William Shakespeare (Hamlet, Macbeth, Romeo and Juliet, and As You Like It).

Plot
The cartoon opens with a writer, who looks similar to William Shakespeare, coming across a castle with a mailbox with "Macbeth" written on it. At this, he begins to write a play based on this title. He hears the loud screeching laugh of Witch Hazel and watches her stir her cauldron. The witch has Bugs Bunny sleeping on a platter and wakes him up. He believes the cauldron to be a bath and readily climbs in, only realizing his mistake after reading her open recipe book. Bugs quickly jumps out of the boiling cauldron and first angrily confronts, then runs away from Witch Hazel towards the castle when she tries to attack him with a meat cleaver. Witch Hazel pursues Bugs Bunny on her flying broomstick. We then see the poet again trying to write after Bugs and the witch have departed.

At the castle, Witch Hazel and Bugs run into each other and they have a little laughing contest, then Bugs runs up a tall tower, saying "You hoo! Granny! Here I am!" and Witch Hazel says after that "And here I come!" while she is on her broomstick, but it goes backwards; Witch Hazel then says "Oh we women drivers! I had the silly thing in reverse!" Then she flies up to the tower, saying in baby talk "Hello", where Bugs gives her a heavy weight and says, "Good-bye!" As the witch falls down with it, she cries out "Good grief!" then Bugs says, "Good riddance!" She crashes to the ground with her broom destroyed and the chase continues. Bugs acts as Romeo to try to trick Witch Hazel, who starts to quote Juliet's lines from the play, but soon the two improvise. Witch Hazel jumps out of the castle window as Bugs pretends that he will catch her and instead rapidly runs off.

As Bugs runs out from the castle he runs into the poet, who is crying because he says that he will never be a writer. Bugs finds out that he is not William Shakespeare, but is actually called Sam Crubish. Witch Hazel hears this and it appears that the two know each other, but have not seen each other in a while because Crubish never showed up to meet her family at what Crubish incorrectly thought was Apartment 2B. Sam and Witch Hazel leave talking about who made the mistake of saying "2B" and the cartoon closes with Bugs Bunny quoting the famous line from Hamlet – "To be, or not to be, that is the question."

Additional crew members
Layout Artist: Owen Fitzgerald
Visual Backgrounds: Bob Singer
Film Editor: Treg Brown

References

External links

 
 

1959 films
1959 animated films
1959 short films
1950s Warner Bros. animated short films
Cultural depictions of William Shakespeare
Films directed by Abe Levitow
Looney Tunes shorts
Animated films about rabbits and hares
Films based on works by William Shakespeare
Films about witchcraft
Films scored by Milt Franklyn
Bugs Bunny films
Films with screenplays by Michael Maltese
1950s English-language films
Films set in castles